The Thames Tunnel is a tunnel beneath the River Thames in London, connecting Rotherhithe and Wapping. It is the first tunnel known to have been constructed successfully underneath a navigable river. It was built between 1825 and 1843 by Marc Brunel and his son Isambard using the tunnelling shield newly invented by the elder Brunel and Thomas Cochrane.

The tunnel was originally designed for horse-drawn carriages, but was mainly used by pedestrians and became a tourist attraction. In 1869 it was converted into a railway tunnel for use by the East London line which, since 2010, is part of the London Overground railway network under the ownership of Transport for London.

History and development

Construction

At the start of the 19th century, there was a pressing need for a new land connection between the north and south banks of the Thames to link the expanding docks on each side of the river. The engineer Ralph Dodd tried, but failed, to build a tunnel between Gravesend and Tilbury in 1799.

Between 1805–1809, a group of Cornish miners, including Richard Trevithick, tried to dig a tunnel further upriver between Rotherhithe and Wapping/Limehouse, but failed because of the difficult conditions of the ground. The Cornish miners were used to hard rock and did not modify their methods for soft clay and quicksand. This Thames Archway project was abandoned after the initial pilot tunnel (a 'driftway') flooded twice when  of a total of  had been dug. The failure of the Thames Archway project led engineers to conclude that "an underground tunnel is impracticable".

The Anglo-French engineer Marc Brunel refused to accept this conclusion. In 1814 he proposed to Emperor Alexander I of Russia a plan to build a tunnel under the river Neva in St Petersburg. This scheme was turned down (a bridge was built instead) and Brunel continued to develop ideas for new methods of tunnelling.

Brunel patented the tunnelling shield, a revolutionary advance in tunnelling technology, in January 1818. In 1823 Brunel produced a plan for a tunnel between Rotherhithe and Wapping, which would be dug using his new shield. Financing was soon found from private investors, including the Duke of Wellington, and a Thames Tunnel Company was formed in 1824, the project beginning in February 1825.

The first step was the construction of a large shaft on the south bank at Rotherhithe,  back from the river bank. It was dug by assembling an iron ring  in diameter above ground. The whole apparatus was estimated to weigh . The soil below the ring's sharp lower edge was removed manually by Brunel's workers. The whole shaft thus gradually sank under its own weight, slicing through the soft ground rather like an enormous pastry cutter.

The shaft became stuck at one point during its sinking, as the pressure of the earth around it held it firmly in position. Extra weight was required to make it continue its descent. 50,000 bricks were added as temporary weights. It was realised that the problem was caused because the shaft's sides were parallel. Years later when the Wapping shaft was built, it was slightly wider at the bottom than the top. This non-cylindrical tapering design ensured it did not get stuck. By November 1825 the Rotherhithe shaft was in place and tunnelling work could begin.

The tunnelling shield, built at Henry Maudslay's Lambeth works and assembled in the Rotherhithe shaft, was the key to Brunel's construction of the Thames Tunnel. The Illustrated London News described how it worked:

The key innovation of the tunnelling shield was its support for the unlined ground in front and around it to reduce the risk of collapses. However, many workers, including Brunel himself, soon fell ill from the poor conditions caused by filthy sewage-laden water seeping through from the river above. This sewage gave off methane gas which was ignited by the miners' oil lamps. When the resident engineer, John Armstrong, fell ill in April 1826, Marc's son Isambard Kingdom Brunel took over at the age of 20.

Work was slow, progressing at only  a week. To earn income from the tunnel, the company directors allowed sightseers to view the shield in operation. They charged a shilling for the adventure and an estimated 600–800 visitors took advantage of the opportunity every day.

The excavation was hazardous. The tunnel flooded suddenly on 18 May 1827 after  had been dug. Isambard Kingdom Brunel lowered a diving bell from a boat to repair the hole at the bottom of the river, throwing bags filled with clay into the breach in the tunnel's roof. Following the repairs and the drainage of the tunnel, he held a banquet inside it.

Closure
The tunnel flooded again the following year, on 12 January 1828, in which six men died. Isambard was extremely lucky to survive this. The six men had made their way to the main stairwell, as the emergency exit was known to be locked. Isambard instead made for the locked exit. A contractor named Beamish heard him there and broke the door down, and an unconscious Isambard was pulled out and revived. He was sent to Brislington, near Bristol, to recuperate. There he heard about the competition to build what became the Clifton Suspension Bridge.

Financial problems followed, leading in August to the tunnel being walled off just behind the shield and then abandoned for seven years.

Completion

In December 1834 Marc Brunel succeeded in raising enough money, including a loan of £247,000 from the Treasury,  to continue construction.

Starting in August 1835 the old rusted shield was dismantled and removed. By March 1836 the new shield, improved and heavier, was assembled in place and boring resumed.

Impeded by further floods, (23 August and 3 November 1837, 20 March 1838, 3 April 1840) fires and leaks of methane and hydrogen sulphide gas, the remainder of the tunnelling was completed in November 1841, after another five and a half years. The extensive delays and repeated flooding made the tunnel the butt of metropolitan humour:

The Thames Tunnel was fitted out with lighting, roadways and spiral staircases during 1841–1842. An engine house on the Rotherhithe side, which now houses the Brunel Museum, was also constructed to house machinery for draining the tunnel. The tunnel was finally opened to the public on 25 March 1843.

Pedestrian usage

Although it was a triumph of civil engineering, the Thames Tunnel was not a financial success. It had cost £454,000 to dig and another £180,000 to fit out – far exceeding its initial cost estimates. Proposals to extend the entrance to accommodate wheeled vehicles failed owing to cost, and it was used only by pedestrians. It became a major tourist attraction, attracting about two million people a year, each paying a penny to pass through, and became the subject of popular songs. The American traveller William Allen Drew commented that "No one goes to London without visiting the Tunnel" and described it as the "eighth wonder of the world". When he saw it for himself in 1851, he pronounced himself "somewhat disappointed in it" but still left a vivid description of its interior, which was more like an underground marketplace than a transport artery:

Other opinions of the tunnel were more negative; some regarded it as the haunt of prostitutes and "tunnel thieves" who lurked under its arches and mugged passers-by. The American writer Nathaniel Hawthorne visited it a few years after Drew, and wrote in 1855 that the tunnel:

Conversion into a railway tunnel

The tunnel was purchased in September 1865 at a cost of £800,000 by the East London Railway Company, a consortium of six mainline railways which sought to use the tunnel to provide a rail link for goods and passengers between Wapping (and later Liverpool Street) and the South London Line. The tunnel's generous headroom, resulting from the architects' original intention of accommodating horse-drawn carriages, also provided a sufficient loading gauge for trains.

The line's engineer was Sir John Hawkshaw who was also noted, with W. H. Barlow, for the major re-design and completion of Isambard Brunel's long-abandoned Clifton Suspension Bridge at Bristol, which was completed in 1864.

The first train ran through the tunnel on 7 December 1869. In 1884, the tunnel's disused construction shaft to the north of the river was repurposed to serve as Wapping station.

The East London Railway was later absorbed into the London Underground, where it became the East London Line. It continued to be used for goods services as late as 1962. During the Underground days, the Thames Tunnel was the oldest underground piece of the Tube's infrastructure.

It was planned to construct an intersection between the East London Line and the Jubilee Line extension at Canada Water station. As construction would require the temporary closure of the East London Line, it was decided to take this opportunity to perform long-term maintenance on the tunnel and so in 1995 the East London Line was closed to allow construction and maintenance to take place. The proposed repair method for the tunnel was to seal it against leaks by "shotcreting" it with concrete, obliterating its original appearance, causing a controversy that led to a bitter conflict between London Underground who wished to complete the work as quickly and cheaply as possible and architectural interests wishing to preserve the tunnel's appearance. The architectural interests won, with the Grade II*listing of the tunnel on 24 March 1995, the day London Underground had scheduled the start of the long-term maintenance work.

Following an agreement to leave a short section at one end of the tunnel untreated, and more sympathetic treatment of the rest of the tunnel, the work went ahead and the route reopened – much later than originally anticipated – in 1998. The tunnel closed again from 23 December 2007 to permit tracklaying and resignalling for the East London Line extension. The extension work resulted in the tunnel becoming part of the new London Overground. After its reopening on 27 April 2010, it was used by mainline trains again.

Influence

The construction of the Thames Tunnel showed that it was indeed possible to build underwater tunnels, despite the previous scepticism of many engineers. Several new underwater tunnels were built in the UK in the following decades: the Tower Subway in London; the Severn Tunnel under the River Severn; and the Mersey Railway Tunnel under the River Mersey. Brunel's tunnelling shield was later refined, with James Henry Greathead playing a particularly important role in developing the technology.

In 1991, the Thames Tunnel was designated as an International Historic Civil Engineering Landmark by the American Society of Civil Engineers and the Institution of Civil Engineers.

In 1995 the tunnel was listed at Grade II* in recognition of its architectural importance.

In 1835, the Italian poet Giacomo Leopardi parodied the construction of the Thames Tunnel in lines 126–129 of the poem .

Visiting

Nearby in Rotherhithe, Brunel's engine house (built to house drainage pumps) is open to visitors as the Brunel Museum.

In the 1860s, when trains started running through the tunnel, the entrance shaft at Rotherhithe was used for ventilation. The staircase was removed to reduce the risk of fire. In 2011, a concrete raft was built near the bottom of the shaft, above the tracks, when the tunnel was upgraded for the London Overground network. This space, with walls blackened with smoke from steam trains, forms part of the museum and functions at times as a concert venue and occasional bar. A rooftop garden has been built on top of the shaft. In 2016 the entrance hall opened as an exhibition space, with a staircase providing access to the shaft for the first time in over 150 years.

See also
Crossings of the River Thames
Tunnels underneath the River Thames

Notes

References

External links 

"Brief history during the Snow era" UCLA School of Public Health
The Brunel Museum – Based in Rotherhithe, London, the museum is housed in the building that contained the pumps to keep the Thames Tunnel dry
Brunel's Thames Tunnel BBC News – Slideshow of Thames Tunnel images
London's Oldest Underwater Tunnel – slideshow by Life magazine
The Thames Tunnel: a tunnel book Flickr, 23 May 2006 – Photos of a promotional book commemorating the opening of the tunnel
Thames Tunnel Brunel portal
, published in 1882, actually marks the tunnel Old-Maps
Thames Tunnel photoset Flickr, 12–13 March 2010
Photos of the East London Line and Thames Tunnel while still London Underground
Thames Tunnel: Rare access to 'eighth wonder of world' – BBC News (26 May 2014) – A brief 'potted history' (a 2-minute video filmed in the tunnel)
Thames Tunnel Company (1836) An explanation of the works of the tunnel under the Thames from Rotherhithe to Wapping - digital facsimile from the Linda Hall Library

Tunnels completed in 1843
Railway tunnels in London
Transport in the London Borough of Southwark
Transport in the London Borough of Tower Hamlets
Tunnels underneath the River Thames
Works of Isambard Kingdom Brunel
London Overground
Grade II* listed tunnels
Historic Civil Engineering Landmarks
Rotherhithe
Wapping
1843 establishments in England
Grade II* listed buildings in the London Borough of Southwark
Grade II* listed buildings in the London Borough of Tower Hamlets
Pedestrian tunnels in the United Kingdom